Men Without Honour is a 1939 British crime film directed by Widgey R. Newman and starring Ian Fleming, Howard Douglas and Grace Arnold. The film was made at Bushey Studios, as a low-budget B film designed to go on the bottom-half of a double bill.

Synopsis
A disgraced lawyer ends up working for a gang of share-pushers. He becomes outraged when he discovers that they are scamming his son's prospective father-in-law and eventually unmasks the villains with the help of the police.

Cast
 Ian Fleming as Frank Hardy  
 Howard Douglas as Fane  
 W.T. Hodge as Vigor  
 Charles Paton as Rev. Fanshawe  
 Grace Arnold as Mrs. Hardy  
 Alastair Hunter as John Hardy  
 Edith Clinton as Enid Fanshawe 
 Charles Courtney as Field 
 Tony Melrose as Commissioner 
 George Dewhurst as Inspector Smith 
 Rex Alderman as Barclay

References

Bibliography
Chibnall, Steve. Quota Quickies: The Birth of the British 'B' Film. British Film Institute, 2007.
Wood, Linda. British Films, 1927–1939. British Film Institute, 1986.

External links
 

1939 films
1939 crime drama films
British crime drama films
Films set in London
Bushey Studios films
Films directed by Widgey R. Newman
British black-and-white films
Quota quickies
1930s English-language films
1930s British films